Jonathan Healy (born April 4, 1997) is an American taekwondo athlete. He won the gold medal at the 2019 Pan American Games on the men's +80 kg.

References 

Living people
1997 births
American male taekwondo practitioners
Pan American Games medalists in taekwondo
Pan American Games gold medalists for the United States
Taekwondo practitioners at the 2019 Pan American Games
Universiade medalists in taekwondo
Universiade bronze medalists for the United States
Medalists at the 2017 Summer Universiade
Medalists at the 2019 Pan American Games
21st-century American people